The 1992–93 Arkansas Razorbacks men's basketball team represented the University of Arkansas as a member of the Southeastern Conference during the 1992–93 college basketball season. The head coach was Nolan Richardson, serving for his eighth year. The team played its home games in Barnhill Arena in Fayetteville, Arkansas. This was the last year that the Razorbacks would play in Barnhill Arena. The Razorbacks were the 1993 SEC West Division Champions. Senior guard Robert Shepherd was named 1st Team SEC, and freshman forward Corliss Williamson was named to the SEC All-Freshman Team. The Hogs defeated Holy Cross and St. John's in the first and second rounds, respectively, of the NCAA tournament, before losing to eventual national champions North Carolina Tarheels in the Sweet 16.  This team was dubbed "Richardson's Runts" because Dwight Stewart was the tallest player on the team at 6'9".

Roster

Schedule and results

|-
!colspan=9 style=| Regular season

|-
!colspan=9 style=| SEC Tournament

|-
!colspan=9 style=| NCAA Tournament

Sources

Rankings

References

Arkansas
Arkansas
Arkansas Razorbacks men's basketball seasons
Razor
Razor